Carex arapahoensis, known as Arapaho sedge, is a species of sedge endemic to the western United States. It is found only in Colorado and Utah in alpine and subalpine habitat.

References

arapahoensis
Flora of North America
Plants described in 1919